Creon may refer to:

Greek history
 Creon, the first annual eponymous archon of Athens, 682–681 BC

Greek mythology 
 Creon (king of Thebes), mythological king of Thebes
 Creon (king of Corinth), father of Creusa/Glauce in Euripides' Medea
 Creon, son of Heracles by a daughter of Thespius, king of Thespiae

Medicine
 Creon, a brand name of a pancreatic enzymes medication

Places
 Créon, a commune in the Gironde department in France
 Créon-d'Armagnac, a commune in the Landes department in France

Other
 Creon a genus of butterfly, in the family Lycaenidae, containing the species Broadtail royal
 USS Creon (ARL-11), a World War II U.S. Navy landing craft repair ship

See also
Kreon, a DC Comics character
Kreon, a minifigure (similar to Lego minifigure) from Kre-O construction toys manufactured by Oxford, a Korean company, and marketed by Hasbro